NICE Community School District is a public school district located in Ishpeming, Michigan; the acronym stands for the predecessor districts that consolidated in the 1960s and 1970s: National Mine, Ishpeming Township, Champion–Humboldt–Spurr townships, and Ely Township.

The district is currently composed of one elementary school (Aspen Ridge Elementary School), one middle school (Aspen Ridge Middle School), and one high school (Westwood High School).

History
NICE Community School District originally contained several elementary schools scattered across a wide area: West Ishpeming Elementary, North Lake Elementary, Ely Elementary, National Mine Elementary and Champion Elementary; and two middle schools: National Mine Middle School (home of the Cougars) and Champion Middle School (home of the Indians). In the early 1990s these schools were closed, with Aspen Ridge Elementary and Middle School opening in their place.

Schools

Aspen Ridge Elementary and Middle School (ARES and ARMS) have offered a wide array of classes to students since the early 1990s. Though they are housed in the same building, the elementary and middle schools operate as two separate entities. Founded in 1974, Westwood High School is a located in Ishpeming Township.

References

External links
 

School districts in Michigan
Education in Marquette County, Michigan
Education in Baraga County, Michigan
School districts established in 1974